Diego Fernández de Córdoba may refer to:
 Diego Fernández de Córdoba y Arellano, marqués de Comares (1463–1518), Governor of Oran and Mazalquivir and first Viceroy of Navarre
 Diego Fernández de Córdoba y Mendoza, 3rd Count of Cabra, (fl. 1487–1525)
 Diego Fernández de Córdoba, 1st Marquess of Guadalcázar (1578–1630)